Meredith Post is an American television writer. When Douglas Marland died in 1993, she was in the running to become head writer of ATWT. That title went to Juliet Law Packer and Richard Backus.

Positions held
As the World Turns 
Writer (1983–1997)

Days of Our Lives 
Writer (1997–2001)

Awards and nominations
Post has been nominated for six Daytime Emmy awards, in the category Outstanding Drama Series Writing Team, for her work on Days of Our Lives and As the World Turns. She was nominated from 1986 to 1999.

She also won the 2000 Writers Guild of America Award in the Daytime Serials category, for her work on DOOL.

External links
 

American soap opera writers
Year of birth missing (living people)
Living people
Writers Guild of America Award winners